Benjamin Isaacs (July 17, 1778 – July 25, 1846) was a member of the Connecticut Senate representing the 12th District from 1836 to 1837, and a member of the Connecticut House of Representatives in the sessions of May and October 1813, May and October 1815, May and October 1816, May 1817, October 1818, and the years 1819, 1820, 1822, 1824, 1825, 1827, 1828, and 1834.

He was the son of Isaac Scudder Isaacs and Susanna St. John Isaacs.

He was the parish clerk of St. Paul's on the Green from 1815 to 1846.

He served as town clerk of Norwalk from 1814 to 1844.

References

1778 births
1846 deaths
American merchants
City and town clerks
Connecticut state senators
Members of the Connecticut House of Representatives
Politicians from Norwalk, Connecticut